Carphoborus is a genus of crenulate bark beetles within the family Curculionidae. There are at least 40 described species of beetles in Carphoborus.

Species
These 49 species belong to the genus Carphoborus:

 Carphoborus abachidsei Stark, V.N., 1952 c
 Carphoborus africanus Nunberg, 1964b c
 Carphoborus andersoni Swaine, 1919 i c
 Carphoborus ater Schedl (Eggers in), 1979c c
 Carphoborus attritus Peyerimhoff, 1931 c
 Carphoborus balgensis Murayama, 1943b c
 Carphoborus bicornis Wood, 1986 i c
 Carphoborus bicornus b
 Carphoborus bicristatus Chapuis, 1869 c
 Carphoborus bifurcus Eichhoff, 1868 i c
 Carphoborus blaisdelli Swaine, 1924 i c b
 Carphoborus bonnairei Brisout, C., 1884 c
 Carphoborus borealis Karpinski, 1933b c
 Carphoborus boswelliae Wood & Bright, 1992 c
 Carphoborus brevisetosus Wood, 1954 i c
 Carphoborus carri Swaine, 1917 i c b
 Carphoborus cholodkovskyi Spessivtsev, P., 1916 c
 Carphoborus convexifrons Wood, 1954 i c
 Carphoborus costatus Wichmann, H.E., 1915a c
 Carphoborus cressatyi Bruck, 1936b c
 Carphoborus declivis Wood, 1943 i c b
 Carphoborus dunni Swaine, 1924 i c
 Carphoborus engelmanni Wood, 1951b c
 Carphoborus frontalis Wood, 1954 i c b
 Carphoborus henscheli Reitter, 1887b c
 Carphoborus intermedius Wood, 1954 i c
 Carphoborus jurinskii Eggers, 1910e c
 Carphoborus kushkensis Sokanovskii, B.V., 1954 c
 Carphoborus latus Wood, 1988b c
 Carphoborus marani Pfeffer, 1941e c
 Carphoborus mexicanus Bright, 1972b c
 Carphoborus minimus (Fabricius, J.C., 1798) c g
 Carphoborus perplexus Wood, 1960 i c
 Carphoborus perrisi Wood & Bright, 1992 c g
 Carphoborus piceae Wood, 1974 i c
 Carphoborus pini Eichhoff, 1881a c
 Carphoborus pinicolens Wood, 1954 i c
 Carphoborus ponderosae Swaine, 1924 i c
 Carphoborus pseudotsugae Wood, 1943 i c
 Carphoborus radiatae Swaine, 1918 i c
 Carphoborus rossicus Semenov Tjan-Shansky, A.P., 1902 c
 Carphoborus sansoni Swaine, 1924 i c
 Carphoborus simplex LeConte, 1876 i c b
 Carphoborus swainei Bruck, 1933b c
 Carphoborus taireiensis Murayama, 1943b c
 Carphoborus teplouchovi Spessivtsev, P., 1916 c
 Carphoborus tuberculatus Bright, 1964 c
 Carphoborus vandykei Bruck, 1933 i c
 Carphoborus zhobi Wood & Bright, 1992 c

Data sources: i = ITIS, c = Catalogue of Life, g = GBIF, b = Bugguide.net

References

Further reading

External links

 

Scolytinae
Articles created by Qbugbot